Verdejante is a city  in the state of Pernambuco, Brazil. The population in 2020, according with IBGE was 9,553 inhabitants and the total area is 476.03 km².

Geography

 State - Pernambuco
 Region - Sertão Pernambucano
 Boundaries - Ceará state    (N);  Salgueiro    (S and W);  São José do Belmonte and Mirandiba   (E).
 Area - 476.03 km²
 Elevation - 494 m
 Vegetation - Caatinga  hiperxerófila
 Clima - semi arid - (Sertão)
 Annual average temperature - 24.8 c
 Distance to Recife - 500 km

Economy

The main economic activities in Verdejante are based in agribusiness, especially creation of goats, sheep, pigss, cattle, chickens;  and plantations of onions and  beans.

Economic Indicators

Economy by Sector
2006

Health Indicators

References

Municipalities in Pernambuco